Crepello (1954–1974) was a British-bred Thoroughbred racehorse which won England's most prestigious race, the Epsom Derby in 1957 and was later a Leading sire in Great Britain & Ireland.

Pedigree
He was a chestnut horse sired by Donatello II (by Blenheim) in his last year of life. His dam was the race winner, and Star mare, Crepuscule by Mieuxce. Crepuscule created a British bloodstock record by producing Classic winners, Honeylight and Crepello as her first two foals. Crepello was a half-brother to Honeylight (won One Thousand Guineas Stakes) and Twilight Alley (Ascot Gold Cup Stakes).

Racing record
Crepello was trained by Noel Murless at Newmarket. He was always ridden by jockey, Lester Piggott. As a two-year-old he finished second in his debut race, the Windsor Castle Stakes, fourth in the Middle Park Stakes and won the Dewhurst Stakes. Due to unsound forelegs, the horse always raced wearing bandages.

At age three Crepello raced only twice but won two Classic Races. The first was the 2,000 Guineas, followed by a victory over future star Ballymoss in the Epsom Derby. Crepello's winning time of 2:35.4 seconds was the fastest since 1936. However, this was to be the great horse's last race. His tendons, always delicate, began to cause significant problems and he missed the King George VI & Queen Elizabeth Stakes before being retired not long before the St Leger Stakes.

He only had five starts but was undefeated in his last three, all of which are now Group One races.

Stud record
Retired to stud at his owner's Eve Stud in Woodditton, Cambridgeshire, Crepello was the leading sire in Great Britain & Ireland in 1969 and the Champion Broodmare sire in 1974. Notable progeny include:
 Busted, unbeaten at four in 1967 and voted the U.K. Horse of the Year, £58,937 sire
 Caergwrle, winner of the 1968 1000 Guineas, 
 Mysterious, winner of the 1973 1,000 Guineas and The Oaks
 Celina (Irish Oaks) 
 Crepellana (Prix de Diane)
 Crest of the Wave (sire in New Zealand)
 Soderini (stakeswinner, £28,128, sire)
 Bleu Azur, dam of Altesse Royale (Epsom Oaks, One Thousand Guineas, Irish Oaks Stakes etc.)
 Marlia, dam of Marduk II which won the German Derby and consecutive runnings of Germany's Grosser Preis von Baden in 1974 and 1975.

Crepello's record as sire was somewhat restricted by the fact that a number of his stock had bad legs and were untrainable.

Honours
Following the London & North Eastern Railway tradition of naming locomotives after winning racehorses, British Railways "Deltic" Diesel locomotive no. D9012 (later 55012) was named after the horse on 4 September 1961, and remained in service until 18 May 1981.

References

External links
 Crepello's pedigree and racing stats

1954 racehorse births
1974 racehorse deaths
Epsom Derby winners
Racehorses bred in the United Kingdom
Racehorses trained in the United Kingdom
British Champion Thoroughbred broodmare sires
Thoroughbred family 16-d
Chefs-de-Race
2000 Guineas winners